The Calov Bible is a three-volume 17th-century Bible that contains German translations and commentary by Martin Luther and additional commentary by Wittenberg theology professor Abraham Calovius.

Connection with J. S. Bach
The Calov Bible was made famous with the discovery of a long-lost copy that had once belonged to the composer Johann Sebastian Bach. It was not known until the 20th century what these writings were.

In June 1934 a Lutheran pastor, Christian G. Riedel, was attending a convention of the Lutheran Church–Missouri Synod in Frankenmuth, Michigan. While a guest in the home of his cousin, Leonard Reichle, Riedel was shown a volume of the Bible in which he recognized Bach's signature on the title page. Reichle subsequently located the other two volumes in his attic, relating that his family had purchased them in the 1830s, in Philadelphia. In October 1938, Reichle donated the three volumes to the Concordia Seminary Library in St. Louis, Missouri. Only after the upheavals of World War II, however, did this Bible become known to Bach scholarship.
At the end of the year 2017 a facsimile reprint of Bach's Bible was published by the Dutch publisher Van Wijnen of Franeker, in close co-operation with the owners, Concordia Seminary Library.

The Calov Bible is in three volumes, each signed on its main title page by J. S. Bach, who followed his signature with the date, 1733. The volumes contain 348 underlinings, marks of emphasis, and marginalia in Bach's hand, an attribution that has been proven by handwriting analysis and chemical analysis of the ink. In many instances Bach was correcting typographical or grammatical errors. Three of Bach's more important annotations are in proximity to the following passages.

References

External links
Bach marginalia in Calov Bible contextualized in an analysis of the Fugue No. 18 in G-sharp minor, BWV 887, from Book II of The Well-Tempered Clavier pdf or Shockwave
Dr. Thomas Rossin - short video on the history of the Calov Bible: http://exultate.org/wp-content/uploads/2019/10/Bach-Bible-History.mp4
Information on the facsimile reprint of Bach's Calov Bible on www.bachbible.com.

17th-century books
Bible translations into German
Johann Sebastian Bach
1934 in Michigan